B. Joseph Wigmore (born 1892) was a professional footballer, who played for Dinnington and Huddersfield Town.

References

1892 births
Year of death missing
English footballers
Association football defenders
English Football League players
Huddersfield Town A.F.C. players
Place of birth missing